Coenosiini is a tribe of flies from the family Muscidae.

Genera
Altimyia Couri, 2008
Apsil Malloch, 1934
Bithoracochaeta Stein, 1911 
Coenosia Meigen, 1826
Cordiluroides Albuquerque, 1954 
Insulamyia Couri, 1982 
Limnospila Schnabl, 1902
Lispocephala Pokorny, 1893
Macrorchis Rondani, 1877
Neodexiopsis Malloch, 1920
Notoschoenomyza Malloch, 1934
Orchisia Rondani, 1877
Oxytonocera Stein, 1919 
Pentacricia Stein, 1898 
Pilispina Albuquerque, 1954 
Plumispina Albuquerque, 1954 
Pseudocoenosia Stein, 1916
Reynoldsia Malloch, 1934
Schoenomyza Haliday, 1833
Schoenomyzina Malloch, 1934
Spanochaeta Stein, 1919
Spathipheromyia Bigot, 1884
Stomopogon Malloch, 1930

References

Muscidae
Articles containing video clips
Brachycera tribes